Ace of Spades is a 2021 young adult thriller novel by British Nigerian writer Faridah Àbíké-Íyímídé, published June 1, 2021 by Feiwel & Friends.

Plot 
Devon Richards and Chiamaka Adebayo are the only two Black students at their elite private school, Niveus Private Academy and exist in completely different social spheres, Chiamaka being the schools ruthless Queen Bee and Devon being an unpopular Music geek. They barely know each other and have never spoken to each other. Chiamaka is also from a rich background, while Devon is from a humble, working-class family in a rough neighbourhood consisting of his single mother and two younger brothers. Devon’s father was imprisoned several years ago. 

Both are bright and hopeful for their Senior Year at Niveus, Chiamaka (a straight A student) hoping to attend Yale University and Devon hoping to go to Juilliard to study Music. Both are named as school prefects, along with two other students. Chiamaka (the Head Prefect) is not surprised, having been Head Prefect for her grade since Sophomore Year. Devon, however, is surprised at his title. However, he is pleased as being a Prefect will look good in his College application. The new Headmaster, Headmaster Ward, is cold towards the Prefects.

Chiamaka has two girls by her side in a Clique, Ruby and Ava. Ruby (another Prefect) is a jealous, spoiled and spiteful girl who secretly envies Chiamaka’s power in school, and Ava, though apparently honest and kind, also cannot stand Chiamaka. Chiamaka’s true best friend is a boy called Jamie, a ditzy football player whom she has a crush on (and hooked up with a while ago at a party). Chiamaka believes Jamie is going to ask her to be his Girlfriend, but it turns out he is actually asking out a girl called Belle, a Field Hockey player known for her dazzling personality and good looks. Devon and his only friend, Jack, who is from a similar, working-class background to Devon, having two younger brothers and living with his Uncle (because his mother overdosed). 

A cyberbully with the username "Aces" posts about Devon to the entire student body that shows Devon kissing another male student named Scotty, outing both students and sending the school into an uproar. Unlike Devon, Scotty is from a rich and powerful family, he’s spoiled and popular, playing on the Football team with Jamie and also being part of the Drama Club. Devon, however, could get in trouble if word of his homosexuality gets through to the rough Gang in his neighbourhood. Later, Chiamaka goes shopping to a Candy Store with Jamie. She somehow gets framed for Theft, but Jamie pays for the Candy Chiamaka allegedly stole. Chiamaka cannot understand how the Candy was planted. Soon, “Aces” posts about Chiamaka and the Candy Store incident. 

Devon meets a boy named Terrell in a park. Terrell tells Devon they knew each other as children. They begin a relationship. Soon, more and more incriminating posts and images are sent about both Devon and Chiamaka, one even being a sex tape of Devon and Scotty, humiliating them both and damaging Devon’s reputation in his neighbourhood. Chiamaka reports “Aces” to Headmaster Ward, but somehow “Aces” frames them for the posts, making it look like Devon and Chiamaka were posting about each other. This forces them to work together to discover who “Aces” really is, why they selected Chiamaka and Devon to humiliate, and why they want to ruin both students' futures.

Meanwhile, Chiamaka is jealous of Belle. Jamie is very happy with her and begins ignoring Chiamaka. An “Aces” post leads to Chiamaka and Jamie’s hook-up being discovered. Chiamaka becomes one of the bottom in the Social Chain, having pretty much no friends except a distant Jamie (who’s true colours appear to be showing). However, the pair reconcile. Chiamaka also starts warming up to Belle, who is sweet and caring, and disgusted by “Aces” and the posts they make. Jack and Devon’s friendship has dissolved completely, a post about Jack was made claiming Jack is on drugs (which is what killed Jack’s mother). Jack has also stopped being friends with Devon because Devon is now openly Gay at School. Though Jack was aware of Devon’s sexuality before he was outed by “Aces” he had been distant with Devon ever since Devon came out to Jack. Jack claims he can’t be friends with Devon in fear that his brothers will be attacked because they are related to Jack, and Jack is Devon’s friend. Devon untimely comes to resent Niveus Academy. 

Belle and Jamie breakup. Belle, having forgiven Chiamaka for hooking up with Jamie as it was before he and Belle got together, becomes best friends with Chiamaka. They watch movies together and Belle meets Chiamaka’s parents. However, Chiamaka soon realises that her feelings for Belle is more than just a friendship. Chiamaka comes out to Belle as Queer, being confused about her sexuality. Belle admits that she is a closeted Bisexual person. The pair make out and decide to start dating. Devon, feeling lonely, begins spending more time with Terrell, becoming more and more open with their feelings for each other, and trying to forget about his ex-lover, Leader of the rough Gang in his neighbourhood, Andre. Soon, rumours spread about Belle and Chiamaka, but they don’t care as they are happy. Jamie confronts Chiamaka about her relationship with Belle, accusing her of only dating Belle to snipe him. He refuses to accept Chiamaka is now openly Queer. 

Near the end of the book, Chiamaka and Devon learn that “Aces” is not a single entity but rather the entire student body, and the School Faculty and Staff. Everyone at Niveus is working in tandem to destroy the lives of Black students, having done so since the 1960s. It is a tradition that every decade, two Black students are admitted into Niveus and given every opportunity the school can offer for a good future, only to then use “Aces” in their Senior Year as a way of ruining the Black students lives and making their Senior Year so bad they drop out. They also discover that Niveus Private Academy is one of many private institutions across the country that, due to age-old ties to slavery and the Confederacy, rarely accept Black students, but when they do, their goal is to perform social eugenics by allowing the students to climb in the school, then, in their senior year, destroy their futures, disallowing Black individuals to succeed in the world beyond high school.

Determined to stop Niveus, save their reputations and stop future Black students from receiving the same fate, Devon and Chiamaka go to a News Station. A news reporter named Alice promises to help them, by setting up cameras at Niveus to film Headmaster Ward confessing to the tradition, broadcasting it on Live TV, ruining every other Niveus student and teachers reputation. Devon and Chiamaka attend the Snowflake Charity Ball. Chiamaka has a run-in with Jamie, who yells at her for not dropping out, slut-shaming her for hooking up with him at a party. Chiamaka merely scold him back for pretending to be friends with her since Freshman Year, gaslighting her whenever he felt like it, manipulating her into only talking to people whom he approved of and now slut-shaming her. 

Headmaster Ward reveals that Alice is working with him, that there are no cameras filming them and that the Black students before them who didn’t drop out were murdered, just like they will be. However, Niveus Private Academy suddenly goes on Fire. Soon, the building is up in smoke. Devon, Chiamaka, most of the student body and Terrell make it out alive, however the School is destroyed. Three students are also burned to death, including Jamie. With Niveus finished, all the students must transfer schools, which is tough for the Seniors since they will have to switch in the middle of their most important academic year. 

Ten years on, Devon is living with his mother still (though he previously lived in his own place before when he and his mother were estranged). Devon is a College Professor, teaching Music. He’s also engaged to Terrell. Chiamaka achieved her dreams of graduating Yale and becoming a successful Doctor. She is married to a woman named Mia, who is pregnant. Devon and Chiamaka are also Co-Founders of a secret society forever working on stopping institutions like Niveus.

Reception 
Ace of Spades received a starred review from School Library Journal and Publishers Weekly, as well as a positive review from Booklist.

In their review, Publishers Weekly noted, "Àbíké-Íyímídé excels in portraying the conflict of characters who exist in two worlds, one of white privilege and one in which Blackness is not a disadvantage but a point of pride. The story feels slightly overlong, but Devon and Chiamaka are dynamic and multifaceted, deeply human in the face of Aces’ treatment."

School Library Journal, and The Boston Globe named it one of the best young adult books of 2021. The Young Folks called it one of the best debuts of 2021. Buzzfeed said it had one of the best young adult book covers of young adult books for 2021.

References 

Feiwel & Friends books
LGBT-related young adult novels
2021 children's books
2021 Nigerian novels 
Nigerian English-language novels
Nigerian LGBT novels
2021 British novels